The 1932 United States presidential election in Indiana took place on November 8, 1932, as part of the 1932 United States presidential election. State voters chose 14 representatives, or electors, to the Electoral College, who voted for president and vice president.

Indiana was won by Governor Franklin D. Roosevelt (D–New York), running with Speaker John Nance Garner, with 54.67% of the popular vote, against incumbent President Herbert Hoover (R–California), running with Vice President Charles Curtis, with 42.94% of the popular vote.

Results

Results by county

See also
 United States presidential elections in Indiana

References

Indiana
1932
1932 Indiana elections